Helmut Hönl (February 10, 1903 in Mannheim, Germany – March 29, 1981 in Freiburg im Breisgau) was a German theoretical physicist who made contributions to quantum mechanics and the understanding of atomic and molecular structure.

Biography
From 1921 to circa 1923, Hönl studied at the University of Heidelberg and the University of Göttingen, followed by the University of Munich, where he studied under Arnold Sommerfeld.  He was granted his doctor of philosophy in 1926.  In 1929, he became assistant to Paul Peter Ewald at the Stuttgart Technische Hochschule until 1933, after which he was a Privatdozent. 1940 he became extraordinary professor at the University of Erlangen and 1943 ordinary professor for theoretical physics at the University of Freiburg, where he emerited 1971.

Even before acquiring his doctorate at Munich, Hönl had done seminal work which contributed to the advancement of quantum mechanics and the understanding of atomic and molecular structure and spectra.  Some of his work was done in collaboration with Fritz London.  As is the case in any fast developing field with a high level of interest, others independently make similar findings.  This was the case with his work on the intensity of Zeeman effect spectral lines.  Both Hönl and Samuel Goudsmit and Ralph de Laer Kronig published results in 1925.  Their work was promptly put into use.  In the first paper of the trilogy  which launched the matrix mechanics formulation of quantum theory in 1925, Werner Heisenberg, a former student of Sommerfeld, working with Max Born at the University of Göttingen, used the work of Hönl, Kronig, and Goudsmit, referring to it as the “Goudsmit-Kronig-Hönl formula.”

At this time, there were three centers of development for quantum mechanics and the interpretation of atomic and molecular structure, based on atomic and molecular spectroscopy, especially the Sommerfeld-Bohr model:  the Theoretical Physics Institute at the University of Munich, under Arnold Sommerfeld, the Institute of Theoretical Physics at the University of Göttingen, under Max Born, and the Institute of Theoretical Physics, under Niels Bohr.  These three institutes effectively formed a consortium for the exchange of assistants and researchers. Furthermore, with Sommerfeld educating such capable physicists, when they were called to other facilities, they effectively became extensions of Sommerfeld’s Institute of Theoretical Physics.

This was the case with Hönl when he went to the Stuttgart Technische Hochschule to work with Paul Peter Ewald, who received his Ph.D. under Sommerfeld and became ordinarius professor of theoretical physics at Stuttgart Technische Hochschule in 1921.  At Stuttgart, Ewald and Hönl worked on the quantum theory atomic and molecular structure and solid-state physics.  They developed a theoretical model of electron densities and the atomic scattering factor in solids.  Their work has been referenced in the literature as the Ewald-Hönl-Brill model (after the German physicist Rudolf Brill).

Selected Literature

Arnold Sommerfeld and Helmut Hönl Über die Intensität der Multiplett-Linien, Sitzungsberichte der Preußischen Akademie der Wissenschaften. Physikalisch-mathematische Klasse. 141-161 (1925) as cited in Arnold Sommerfeld Bibliography – Sommerfeld Project.
Helmut Hönl “The intensity of Zeeman components” (Translated from the German) Zeitschrift für Physik 31 340-354 (1925)
Helmut Hönl  and Fritz London “The intensities of the band lines” (Translated from the German) Zeitschrift für Physik 33 803-809 (1925)
Helmut Hönl “The intensity problem of spectral lines” (Translated from the German) Annalen der Physik 79  273-323 (1926)
P. P. Ewald and H. Hönl  "The x-ray interferences in diamond as a wave-mechanical problem. Part I." (English translation from the German) Annalen der Physik 25 (4): 281-308 (1936)
P. P. Ewald and H. Hönl "X-ray interference in diamonds as problem of wave mechanics. Part II Analysis of linear atomic chains." (English translation from the German) Annalen der Physik 26 (8): 673-696 (1936)

References
Mehra, Jagdish, and Helmut Rechenberg The Historical Development of Quantum Theory. Volume 5 Erwin Schrödinger and the Rise of Wave Mechanics. Part 1 Schrödinger in Vienna and Zurich 1887-1925. (Springer, 2001) 
van der Waerden, B. L., editor, Sources of Quantum Mechanics (Dover Publications, 1968)

Notes

Quantum physicists
1903 births
1981 deaths
20th-century German physicists
Scientists from Mannheim